The 2015 FIFA Women's World Cup qualification UEFA preliminary round was the UEFA qualifying preliminary round for the 2015 FIFA Women's World Cup.

The eight lowest teams entered the tournament in the preliminary round were drawn into two groups of four. The two best placed teams in each group advanced to the next round where they competed among the other thirty-eight teams entered. The preliminary round was drawn on 18 December 2012. Malta and Lithuania as hosts were the only seeded teams. Matches were played from 4 to 9 April 2013.

Tiebreakers
If two or more teams were equal on points on completion of the group matches, the following tie-breaking criteria were applied:
 Higher number of points obtained in the matches played between the teams in question;
 Superior goal difference resulting from the matches played between the teams in question;
 Higher number of goals scored in the matches played between the teams in question;
 If, after having applied criteria 1 to 3, teams still have an equal ranking, criteria 1 to 3 are reapplied exclusively to the matches between the teams in question to determine their final rankings. If this procedure does not lead to a decision, criteria 5 to 9 apply;
 Superior goal difference in all group matches;
 Higher number of goals scored in all group matches;
 If only two teams have the same number of points, and they are tied according to criteria 1–6 after having met in the last round of the group stage, their ranking is determined by a penalty shoot-out (this criterion is not used if more than two teams have the same number of points).
 Position in the UEFA national team coefficient ranking system.

All times are CEST (UTC+02:00).

Group A

Group B

Goalscorers
5 goals
 Marija Vukčević

4 goals
 Heidi Sevdal
 Dorianne Theuma

2 goals

 Furtuna Velaj
 Nino Pasikashvili
 Sonata Vanagaitė
 Rachel Cuschieri

1 goal

 Ellvana Curo
 Suada Jashari
 Dafina Memedov
 Rannvá Andreasen
 Íðunn Magnussen
 Lela Chichinadze
 Khatia Chkonia
 Tatiana Matveeva
 Raimonda Bložytė
 Rita Mažukelyte
 Sophie Maurer
 Nicole Buttigieg
 Ylenia Carabott
 Emma Xuerreb
 Armisa Kuć

References

External links
Women's World Cup – Preliminary round, UEFA.com

Preliminary round